Sailing at the Pacific Games was first contested when the sport was added for the 1969 games at Port Moresby. It has also been included at several of the Pacific Mini Games, starting with the fifth edition held in American Samoa in 1997.

Pacific Games
The sailing events contested at each Pacific Games are listed in the table below. Flag icons and three letter country code indicate the nationality of the gold medal winner of an event, where this information is known; otherwise an (X) is used. Moving the cursor onto a country code with a dotted underline will reveal the name of the gold medal winner. A dash (–) indicates an event that was not contested.

Sailboats

Sailboards
Sailboarding was included from 1987 to 2003 at the South Pacific Games, with 24 of the 27 events won by New Caledonia.

Pacific Mini Games

Sailing joined the Pacific Mini Games program in 1997.

See also
Sailing at the Asian Games
Sailing at the Summer Olympics

Notes

References
 
 

 
Pacific Games
Pacific Games